Miguel Rodrigues  (born 7 December 1996) is a Swiss footballer who plays for Yverdon as a defender.

Club career
On 31 March 2018, Rodrigues made his professional debut with FC Thun in a 2017–18 Swiss Super League match against Grasshopper.

On 23 June 2021, he signed with Yverdon.

Personal life
Rodrigues was born in Switzerland and is of Portuguese descent.

References

External links

1996 births
Footballers from Geneva
Swiss people of Portuguese descent
Living people
Swiss men's footballers
Association football defenders
Servette FC players
FC Thun players
Yverdon-Sport FC players
Swiss Super League players
Swiss Challenge League players